Merged into the City of Glasgow College in 2010

Glasgow Metropolitan College was a further education college located in Glasgow, Scotland. The College was created on 7 February 2005 by the merger of the Glasgow College of Building & Printing and Glasgow College of Food Technology and itself merged with Central College and Glasgow College of Nautical Studies in 2010.

The College of Building and Printing itself was formed from the amalgamation of the College of Building and the College of Printing in 1972. The College of Building has had a presence on the College's current site since 1927.

The preceding colleges had a reputation for the provision of courses within the food, hospitality, tourism, construction and the creative industries. The merger and creation of Glasgow Metropolitan College created Glasgow’s biggest college with over 20,000 student enrolments and 500 members of staff.

Campuses 

The College had five campuses within the city the largest being in the city centre at North Hanover Street. The Glasgow College of Building had a presence on this site since 1927 although the current building was constructed in 1964.

It was announced in 2008 that the College would participate in the creation of a 'super campus' to be built by 2012 and based in Glasgow city centre. This will be the largest college development project ever in the UK and will also be one of the largest in Europe.

The five campuses were all located within the City of Glasgow;

 North Hanover Street Campus, 60 North Hanover Street, Glasgow, G1 2BP
 Cathedral Street Campus, 230 Cathedral Street, Glasgow, G1 2TG
 Rogart Street Campus, 4 Rogart Street, Glasgow, G40 2AA
 Dornoch Street Campus, Dornoch Street, Glasgow, G40 2QT
 Florence Street Campus, 5 Florence Street, Glasgow, G5 0VX

Schools 

The College had four schools:

 School of Built Environment
 School of Communication and Media
 School of Design
 School of Food, Hospitality, Sport and Tourism

References

External links 

 College Website

Further education colleges in Glasgow
Defunct universities and colleges in Scotland